The 1987 Schleswig-Holstein state election was held on 13 September 1987 to elect the members of the Landtag of Schleswig-Holstein. The election resulted in the Barschel affair.

Results

References 

Elections in Schleswig-Holstein
1987 elections in Germany
September 1987 events in Europe